Dave Cheeseman (born David James Cheeseman, 24 June 1978, Hull, England) is a prolific English underground session musician, known for his work with Sack Trick and Pillow Talk.

Biography
Cheeseman started playing the keyboard after being inspired by Guns N' Roses' live music video of "November Rain", in which frontman Axl Rose can be seen engaging a stadium crowd whilst seated behind a piano. Van Halen and later Dream Theater became the focus of his musical fixations and provided inspiration for his pursuit of keyboard playing perfection.

Cheeseman played keyboards in the York heavy metal outfit Beyond Redemption, with Gideon Letch, Mark Burnett and Evil Clive Jevons, achieving success on the local and underground international metal scene.  The band were also notorious for their stage show, which inevitably involved band members stripping to the waist.

Later on, he founded Pillow Talk with James Jirgens, Gideon Letch and Mark Burnett.  The band's shambolic comedy rock caught the attention of Chris Dale of Sack Trick, who recruited Cheeseman for his own rock outfit.

In the meantime Cheeseman played drums for several Nottingham based indie bands including the  underground folk rockers, Heroic Trio.  He also plays bass guitar in a tribute band, Beyond Comprehension.

Cheeseman also plays for Twin Zero, a Reuben Gotto rock project based in London.

Cheeseman is also a Hull City A.F.C. supporter and is regularly seen at the KC Stadium.

Bands

Beyond Redemption
1997 - 2000
Dave Cheeseman - Keyboards, Vocals
Clive Jevons - Guitar, Vocals
Mark Burnett - Bass Guitar
Yvgeni Vatchkov - Bass Guitar
Gideon Letch - Drums

Beyond Comprehension
1998–Present
Dave Cheeseman - Bass
Gideon Letch - Vocals
Rock God - Guitar
Oliver Robinson - Crew

Pillow Talk
1999–Present
Dave Cheeseman - Keyboards, Vocals
James Jirgens - Guitar, Vocals
Mark Burnett - Bass
Chris Harter - Bass, Vocals
Dr Roland Parker - Bass
Ned Potter - Drums
Chris Smith - Drums
Gideon Letch - Drums, Vocals
Ben Calvert - Drums

Fat Digester
Dave Cheeseman - Keyboards

Heroic Trio
1999–Present
Dave Cheeseman - Drums
Nicola Underdown - Bass, Vocals
Sarah Moore - Guitar, Vocals

The Deltarays
Dave Cheeseman - Drums
Dan Hardy -  guitar
Darren Hardy - Bass
Chris Tomlinson - Vocals
Glen Davies - Drums

Twin Zero
2004–Present
Dave Cheeseman - Keyboards
Anf Morfitt - Bass
Reuben Gotto - Guitar
Karl Middleton- Vocals
Bing Bong - Guitar
Ben Calvert - Drums
Si Hutchby - Drums

Sack Trick
1997–Present
Chris Dale - Bass, Vocals
Reuben Gotto - Guitar, Vocals
Robin Guy - Drums, Vocals
Dave Cheeseman - Keyboards, Vocals

Selected discography
Beyond Redemption - Injury Time EP (2001)
Pillow Talk - Purely Platonic (2001)
Smooth Cheeseboard - Paprika Gentlemen (2002) - Solo project with Chris Smith
Pillow Talk - Painful Love (2003)
Pillow Talk - Criminal Conviction (2005)
Twin Zero - Monolith (2005)
Pillow Talk - "Come On England" (2006) - Single for the 2006 FIFA World Cup
Twin Zero - The Tomb To Every Hope (2006)
Sack Trick - Live in Tokyo (2008)

References

External links
BBC Article
BBC Nottingham Article
Pillow Talk
Sack Trick

1978 births
Living people
Musicians from Kingston upon Hull
English rock musicians
English keyboardists